The Romano R.5 was a French reconnaissance flying boat built in 1932.  It had a parasol wing, a single engine and hull stabilizing sponsons. Only one was built.

Design

In 1929 the French Air Ministry drew up a programme of military aircraft specifications to meet France's needs over the next few years. One part called for a reconnaissance and observation seaplane and the R.5 was Romano's response; at least two other manufacturers also built prototypes, though funding was not yet assured.

The Romano R.5 was an all-metal flying boat. Its parasol wing was built in three parts; its centre section mounted a  Hispano-Suiza 12Nbr water-cooled V-12 engine in tractor configuration on its leading edge and was braced  over the fuselage by parallel pairs of struts from its outer ends to the mid-fuselage. Six short cabane struts braced it centrally.  The inner and cantilever outer panels together provided a trapezoidal plan wing out to rounded tips; ailerons occupied most of the outer panels' trailing edges.  Structurally a mixture of steel and duralumin, with dural skinning, the wing was built around two spars; in the centre section these were elaborated into a trellised girder.

Its , flat-sided  hull was built with of dural and with vedal, layers of dural and pure aluminium, for parts in direct contact with sea-water. The V-form underside had a single step under the wing and, further aft, a water rudder. There were plans to use these to contain retractable wheels to turn the R.5 into an amphibian.

In the nose there was a position for mooring operations, navigation equipment and a machine gun mounting.  The pilots' cabin was ahead of the propeller disc, fully enclosed and with side-by-side seats and dual controls. Behind the wing there were positions for a navigator who also operated the bomb release controls and for a radio and camera operator. Behind them was a dorsal gunner's position, midway between the trailing edge and the tail. The fuselage became slender to the rear, where the tall fin carried a deep, rounded unbalanced rudder.  The R.5's tapered tailplane was raised out of the spray well up on the fin and supported from below with a pair of parallel struts from the upper fuselage.  Its elevators were inset and unbalanced but far enough forward to only require a small central nick for rudder movement.

The Romano R.5 first flew in September 1932. Soon after, it was delivered to the Forces Aérienne de la Mer along with its competitors, the Amiot 110-S and CAMS 80.

Specifications

References

Further reading
 

Parasol-wing aircraft
Flying boats
1930s French military reconnaissance aircraft
R.5
Aircraft first flown in 1932